Manuel Torres Pastor (19 April 1930 – 14 March 2014) was a Spanish professional association football player.

Manuel was born in Teruel, Spain. He spent his career as a defender for Real Zaragoza. In 1957 he joined Real Madrid on a loan deal.

Honours
Real Madrid
European Cup: 1956–57
Spanish League: 1956–57

Club career

References

Spanish footballers
Real Madrid CF players
Real Zaragoza players
1930 births
2014 deaths
UEFA Champions League winning players

Association football defenders